Gus Reyes is an American television producer and theatre director. For nearly ten years was co-founder and Producing Artistic Director of The Next Stage Company, a New York-based performing arts company, where he produced and directed over 200 shows. In New York, Reyes also directed plays, staged reading and or workshops at the Roundabout, Atlantic Theatre (Stage 2), MTC, MCC, Summer Play Festival, the Underwood Theatre and Epic Rep. Regionally, he has worked at the Hartford Stage and the Eugene O'Neill Theater Center in Connecticut, the Adirondack Theatre Festival in New York, the Salt Lake Acting Company in Utah, Onyx in North Carolina, and the Philadelphia Theatre Company in Pennsylvania. He frequently works with J. T. Rogers.

Reyes is the president and owner of Stolen Car Productions, specializing in production, post production and music for film and television, where he directs and or executive produces commercials, documentaries and film projects. He produced the opening sequence for Contest Searchlight on Comedy Central and executive-produced On the Team for Noggin and Nickelodeon. Stolen Car is also Executive Producer for JECO Music, creators of music for film and TV.

Theatre credits

Off and Off-Off Broadway

Atlantic Theater (Stage 2)
White People, by J. T. Rogers
Summer Play Festival
Madagascar, by J. T. Rogers
Epic Rep
Madagascar, by J. T. Rogers
Murmuring in a Dead Tongue, by J. T. Rogers
Beast in the Jungle, by Sasha Kahn
The Next Stage Company (artistic director)
Spreading Out, by Missi Lopez Lecub
Murmuring in a Dead Tongue, by J. T. Rogers
The Further Adventures of Gussie Mae in America, by Letitia Guillory
Whatever the Matter May Be, by Missi Lopez Lecube
Frankfurt & Penetrating Malaysia, by J. T. Rogers
White People, by J. T. Rogers (Best Prod-OOBR, Best of the Best-Backstage)
Bob Comes to Life, by J. T. Rogers
Guy Talk, by J. T. Rogers
Above the Beasts, by J. T. Rogers
MCC Theater
Another Complex, by Cara Bono

Regional
Adirondack Theatre Festival
Madagascar, by J. T. Rogers
Salt Lake Acting Company
Madagascar, by J. T. Rogers (Best Director-Weekly Press)
Seeing the Elephant, by J. T. Rogers
Philadelphia Theatre Company
White People, by J. T. Rogers (Play of the Year-Barrymore nominee)

Various Staged Readings: Hartford Stage, Eugene O'Neill Theater Center, MTC, New Dramatists, etc.

Teacher/Guest Artist/Artist Residencies: New York University Faculty, O'Neill, NTI, University of Utah

Education: North Carolina School of the Arts, B.F.A.

Related skills and experience: Fluent in Spanish; produced over 200 productions and workshops of new plays, films, dance and music concerts, solo performance, and multimedia works.

External links
 www.stolencar.net
 www.jecomusic.com

External reference links
http://theater2.nytimes.com/mem/theater/treview.html?_r=1&html_title=&tols_title=WHITE%20PEOPLE%20(PLAY)&pdate=20000215&byline=By%20BEN%20BRANTLEY&id=1077011432008&scp=2&sq=gus%20reyes&st=cse
https://www.newyorker.com/arts/events/theatre/2009/02/02/090202goth_GOAT_theatre
https://www.variety.com/review/VE1117939557.html?categoryid=33&cs=1
https://web.archive.org/web/20090206090648/http://playbill.com/news/article/125847.html
http://theater2.nytimes.com/gst/theater/tdetails.html?id=1231546496806&scp=3&sq=gus%20reyes&st=cse
http://www.playbill.com/multimedia/gallery//311/?pnum=2
 http://www.nydailynews.com/entertainment/arts/2009/02/04/2009-02-04_white_people_offers_observant_but_heavyh.html
http://broadwayworld.com/blogs/viewblog.cfm?blogid=2348
https://www.timeout.com/newyork/events/theater/265647/white-people
http://www.whitepeopletheplay.com/gusreyes.html
http://www.curtainup.com/whitepeople.html
http://www.imdb.com/name/nm1190827/
https://web.archive.org/web/20090124151516/http://www.nytheatre.com/nytheatre/showpage.php?t=whit7891
https://books.google.com/books?id=WFsdoiSZfboC&pg=PA5&lpg=PA5&dq=Gus+Reyes&source=web&ots=Jby-TlFxPo&sig=fL7GpMFv1hXZ7vtBKd6Ne4WCEUA&hl=en&sa=X&oi=book_result&resnum=9&ct=result
 https://books.google.com/books?id=4YULs2uEvtQC&pg=PA5&lpg=PA5&dq=Gus+Reyes&source=web&ots=awNZw2c-aB&sig=LvD34RdxdtYAJ5gt5pyFEZG-4bU&hl=en&sa=X&oi=book_result&resnum=5&ct=result
https://books.google.com/books?id=CcVciO--PkgC&pg=RA1-PT180&lpg=RA1-PT180&dq=Gus+Reyes&source=web&ots=SpHaCtOubk&sig=2-YbEbbQaaNcO5bZ8tDS_6OUFfw&hl=en&sa=X&oi=book_result&resnum=8&ct=result
http://www.linkedin.com/pub/3/b99/ab3
http://broadwayworld.com/article/WHITE_PEOPLE_Begins_Previews_128_At_The_Atlantic_Stage_20090128
https://web.archive.org/web/20110713165133/http://www.kornbergpr.com/white_people/White_People_press_release.pdf
http://www.jecomusic.com/libraries/contact.php
http://www.stolencar.net/
https://www.nytimes.com/1993/06/28/arts/dance-in-review-450693.html?sq=gus+reyes&scp=4&st=cse
http://tv.nytimes.com/show/158583/On-the-Team/overview?scp=7&sq=gus%20reyes&st=cse
https://web.archive.org/web/20081120121435/http://www.epic-rep.com/2004.htm
https://web.archive.org/web/20090222052326/http://ncarts.edu/drama/dramaalumninews.htm
http://findarticles.com/p/articles/mi_qn4188/is_20041114/ai_n11486428
https://web.archive.org/web/20090129205336/http://atfestival.org/history.htm
https://web.archive.org/web/20110707094924/http://www.aicpshow.com/cgi-bin/member_directory.cgi?num=000000000000106&table=AICP_AMP_mem
https://web.archive.org/web/20110714073035/http://web.memberclicks.com/mc/directory/viewResultsPageByLetter.do?hidWhereTo=R&updateTags=true&userId=&selectPageNav=1&pageNumber=&selectPageNavBottom=1
https://web.archive.org/web/20081118180226/http://www.playpenn.org/05photogallery.html
http://www.oobr.com/top/volTwo/seventeen/OOBR-White.html

http://gasikara.blogspot.com/2005/06/madagascar-play.html
https://web.archive.org/web/20110716063337/https://secure.showbizdata.com/contacts/jobcity.cfm?country=United%20States&job=Post-Production&city=New%20York

American theatre directors
Living people
Year of birth missing (living people)